Brian Koski is an American host, guest and correspondent on football (soccer) talk shows.

Koski was the co-host of Championship Talk  with Georgie Frost, covering the Football League Championship in England. On Championship Talk's Facebook page (4 August 2008) he stated that he was not planning on being part of the show any more for various reasons. Other football shows Koski has been on include World Soccer Daily, A Game of Two Halves, Soccer Shout, and The Beautiful Game.

References

Living people
Association football commentators
Year of birth missing (living people)